Madondo is a South African surname. Notable people with the surname include:

Kulegani Madondo (born 1990), South African football midfielder
Tafadzwa Madondo (1981–2008), Zimbabwean cricketer
Trevor Madondo (1976–2001), Zimbabwean cricketer 

Abraham Madondo (1964–Present), Famous Zimbabwean Soccer Player

Bantu-language surnames